The bride-show was a custom of Byzantine emperors and Russian tsars to choose a wife from among the most beautiful maidens of the country. A similar practice also existed in Imperial China.

See also
Beauty pageant
Book of Esther

References

Further reading

Afinogenov, D. "The Bride-show of Theophilos: Some notes on the Sources", Eranos 95. 1997, pp. 10–18. 
Rydén, Lennart. "The Bride-shows at the Byzantine Court - History or Fiction?" Eranos 83, 1985, pp. 175–191. 
Treadgold, W. T., "The Bride-shows of the Byzantine Emperors", Byzantion 49. 1979, pp. 395–413. 
 Bourboulis, Photeine, “The Bride-Show Custom and the Fairy-Story of Cinderella.” In P. P. Bourboulis, Studies in the History of Modern Greek Story-Motives. Thessalonike, 1953. Pp. 40–52.

Marriage
Wedding
Tsardom of Russia
Byzantine culture
Chinese culture
Russian culture